Greg Frey (born January 29, 1968) is a former American football player.  He is 1986 graduate of St. Xavier High School in Cincinnati, where he played quarterback. As a three-year starting quarterback for the Ohio State Buckeyes, he led the team to two notable come-from-behind wins.  On September 24, 1988, he rallied Ohio State from a 33–20 deficit in the final four minutes to a 36–33 victory over the ninth-ranked LSU Tigers.  On October 28, 1989, the Buckeyes were losing 31–0 to the Minnesota Golden Gophers.  Frey brought the team back for a 41–37 win, throwing a total of 362 yards.

Frey went on to play professional football for the Ohio Glory in the World League of American Football in 1992, and then in the original Arena Football League for the 1993 Cleveland Thunderbolts.

Frey later spent three years as the offensive coordinator for Pickerington High School North, engineering an offense that pushed the team closer to the postseason than any other team in Pickerington history at that time.  He currently offers private coaching services for high school quarterbacks. His best known client was Denver Broncos quarterback Brady Quinn.

A color analyst, Frey broadcast Fox Sports coverage of the AFL's Columbus Destroyers and now calls high school football games on the SportsTime Ohio television network.

References

1968 births
Living people
American football quarterbacks
Cleveland Thunderbolts players
Ohio Glory players
Ohio State Buckeyes football players
High school football coaches in Ohio
St. Xavier High School (Ohio) alumni
Players of American football from Cincinnati